The following is a timeline of the history of the city of Cincinnati, Ohio, USA.

Prior to 19th century
 1788 - Losantiville settled.
 1789 - Fort Washington built.
 1790 -  Losantiville renamed "Cincinnati."
 1791 - First Presbyterian Society formed.
 1793 - Centinel of the North-Western Territory newspaper begins publication.
 1795 - Treaty of Greenville
 1799 - Western Spy, and Hamilton Gazette newspaper begins publication.

19th century
 1802 - David Ziegler becomes mayor.
 1804 - Methodist Episcopal Society founded.
 1810 - Population: 2,540.
 1811 - New Jerusalem Society instituted.
 1813 - Society of Friends formed.
 1814
 Circulating Library Society of Cincinnati founded.
 German Christian Society instituted.
 Treaty of Greenville (1814)
 1817
 Cincinnati Bell, Brass and Iron Foundry established.
 Methodist Episcopal Church incorporated.
 Episcopal Society organized.
 Female Association for the Benefit of Africans formed.
 1818
 Western Museum Society instituted.
 Roman Catholic Society organized.
 Population: 9,120.
 Letton's Museum opens.
 1819
 Cincinnati College founded.
 Liberty Hall and Cincinnati Gazette newspaper begins publication.
 Haydn Society instituted.
 Cincinnati Medical Society established.
 1821 - Apprentices' Library founded.
 1822 - Jewish congregation established.
 1825 - Cincinnati Steam Paper Mill established.
 1826
 Cathedral Basilica of St. Peter in Chains first built.
 Cincinnati Type Foundry in operation.
 Cincinnati Colonization Society organized.
 1827 - Cincinnati Time Store established.
 1828 - Fanny Trollope's bazaar in business.
 1829
 Lane Theological Seminary established.
 Cincinnati riots of 1829; ethnic whites attack blacks
 1834
 Cincinnati receives national attention for the debates on slavery held over 18 evenings in February (see Lane Theological Seminary#The slavery debates).
 1835
 Young Men's Mercantile Library opens.
 First bag of airmail, which was lifted by a hot air balloon 
 1836
The Philanthropist (Cincinnati, Ohio) and German/English-language Volksblatt begin publication.
 Cincinnati riots of 1836; whites attack blacks
 1839 - Ohio Mechanics' Institute fair held.
 1840 - Society for the Promotion of Useful Knowledge organized.
 1841 - Cincinnati riots of 1841; whites attack blacks
 1843 - Whitewater Canal built.
 1844 - Cincinnati Historical Society organized.
 1847
 Strobridge Lithography Company in business.
 First Jewish hospital in the United States opens
 1848 - Turners' Library in operation.
 1849
 First city in the U.S. to hold a municipal song festival, named Saengerfest 
 Historical and Philosophical Society of Ohio relocates to Cincinnati.
 Carthage Road Cemetery founded.
 1850
 Cincinnati Volksfreund begins publication.
 First city in the U.S. where a Jewish hospital was founded 
 Population: 115,435.
 1851 - J. P. Ball photography studio and gallery in operation.
 1852 - Convention of Colored Freemen held.
 1853
 Cincinnati riot of 1853; anti-Catholic riot
 First practical steam fire engine. First city to establish a municipal fire department and first fire pole.
 1854 - Mendenhall's Circulating Library in operation.
 1855 - Cincinnati riots of 1855; whites attacked German-Americans
 1856 - Ehrgott & Forbriger established.
 1858 - Daily Penny Press begins publication.
 1859 - The first horse-drawn streetcars are introduced.
 1865 - Isaac M. Wise Temple (Plum Street Temple) built.
 1866 - John A. Roebling Suspension Bridge opened.
 1867
 Public Library established.
 Cincinnati Conservatory of Music founded.
 1869
 Cincinnati Reds founded
 First weather bureau.
 1870
 First municipal university - the University of Cincinnati
 First city to hold annual industrial expositions 
 Population: 216,239.
 1871 - Tyler Davidson Fountain dedicated.
 1872
 Cincinnati Bar Association established.
 Cincinnati Orchestra founded.
 Newport Southbank Bridge opened.
 1873 - Wielert's built.
 1873- The May Festival Chorus debuts
 1875
 Hebrew Union College, the first Jewish theological school, was established.
 Cincinnati Zoo and Botanical Garden opens.
 1876 - 1876 Republican National Convention
 1877 - Cincinnati Southern Railway begins operating.
 1878 - Cincinnati Music Hall built.
 1880
 1880 Democratic National Convention
 Population: 255,139.
 1884 - Cincinnati riots of 1884
 1885 - Cincinnati Stock Exchange founded.
 1887 - Saint Francis De Sales Catholic Church consecrated. 
 1888 - City hosts Centennial Exposition of the Ohio Valley and Central States.

 1889
 The Cincinnati Red Stockings leave the American Association on November 14, joining the National League along with the Brooklyn Bridegrooms after a dispute with St. Louis Browns owner Chris Von Der Ahe over the selection of a new league president.
 Cincinnati Milling Machine Company incorporated.
 Cincinnati streetcar system begins operating electric streetcars.
 1890
 Cincinnati–Newport Bridge opened.
 Population: 296,908.
 1895 - Cincinnati Symphony Orchestra founded.
 1896 - Business Men's Club of Cincinnati incorporated.
 1897 - John A. Roebling Suspension Bridge re-built and enlarged.

20th century
 1900 - Population: 325,902.
 1902 - First reinforced concrete skyscraper - the Ingalls Building.
 1905 - U.S. premier of Mahler's Symphony No. 5.
 1906 - First university to offer cooperative education, University of Cincinnati.
 1909 - Evening School for Foreigners opens.
 1911 - Mount Airy Forest established.
 1912
 Labor Advocate newspaper begins publication.
 1912, the Cincinnati Reds opened a new steel-and-concrete ballpark, Redland Field (later known as Crosley Field). 
 1914 - Martha, the last passenger pigeon, dies at the Cincinnati Zoo.
 1916 - 9th Street YMCA opens.

 1920
 Cincinnati Subway breaks ground
 Cincinnati Opera begins.
 Population: 401,247.
 1926 - Cincinnati, Hamilton and Dayton Railway (1926–1930) in operation.
 1928 - LeBlond Aircraft Engine Corporation established. Cincinnati Subway cancelled.
 1930 
 Population: 451,160 
 Cincinnati and Lake Erie Railroad in operation.
 1932 - Lane Theological Seminary closed.
 1933 - Cincinnati Union Terminal opens.
 1937 
 Ohio River flood of 1937
 Cincinnati Bengals (1937–41)
 1940 - Population: 455,610 
 1950 - Population:503,998  
 1951 - Last line of the Cincinnati streetcar system is abandoned.
 1952 - First heart-lung machine- makes open heart surgery possible. Developed at Cincinnati Children's Hospital Medical Center.
 1954 - First licensed public television station, WCET. 
 1960 - Population: 502,550.
 1967 - Race riot in Avondale.
 1968 - Riot in Avondale following the assassination of Martin Luther King.

 1977 - Annual convention of the National Rifle Association of America held in city. The "Revolt at Cincinnati" saw a radical new leadership elected, shifting the NRA's focus from hunting and marksmanship towards political action and the right to bear arms.
 1978 - Great Blizzard of 1978
 1979 - 1979 The Who concert disaster
 1983 - Air Canada Flight 797 accident
 1987 - Sister city relationship established with Munich, Germany.
 1988 - Sister city relationships established with Gifu, Gifu, Japan and Liuzhou, China.
 1989 - Sister city relationship established with Kharkiv, Ukraine.
 1990
 Cincinnati Museum Center at Union Terminal opens.
 Cincinnati History Museum opens.
 Population: 364,040.
 Sister city relationship established with Harare, Zimbabwe.
 1991 - Sister city relationship established with Nancy, France.
 1992 - Cincinnati–Newport Bridge demolished.
 1994 - Sister city relationship established with New Taipei, Taiwan.
 1998 - City website online (approximate date).
 1999 - April 1999 Cincinnati tornado

21st century
 2000
 Population: 331,285.
 Paul Brown Stadium opens as the new home of the Cincinnati Bengals.
 Cintas Center opens as the new home of Xavier University's basketball and volleyball teams.
 2001 - Cincinnati riots of 2001.
 2003 – Great American Ball Park opens as the new home of the Cincinnati Reds.
 2005 – Mark Mallory becomes mayor.
 2011 – The annual rivalry game between the men's basketball teams of the city's two NCAA Division I schools, the University of Cincinnati and Xavier University, ends in a bench-clearing brawl.
 2012 - Sister city relationship established with Mysore, India.
 2014 – A basketball game between the women's teams of the local Mount St. Joseph University and Northeast Ohio school Hiram College, focusing on terminally ill MSJ player Lauren Hill, becomes a national event, eventually receiving an ESPY Award in 2015.
2016
 On May 28, a three-year-old boy climbed into the gorilla habitat at the Cincinnati Zoo and was subsequently grabbed and dragged by Harambe, a 17-year-old western lowland gorilla. Afraid for the boy's life, zoo officials made the decision to shoot and kill Harambe. Sparking much controversy, the incident quickly became known internationally. 
 The Cincinnati Bell Connector streetcar system opens.
 FC Cincinnati begins play in the United Soccer League.
 2017 – On January 24, a Nile hippopotamus that would be named Fiona was born at the Cincinnati Zoo six weeks prematurely at about half the normal birth weight for her species. During the zoo's successful attempt to save her, it posted regular social media updates on her progress, and she became the zoo's biggest attraction and a worldwide Internet celebrity.
 2018 – On May 29, Major League Soccer announced that FC Cincinnati would move from the USL to MLS effective with the 2019 season.
 2019
 March 3 – FC Cincinnati made its MLS debut, losing 4–1 at Seattle Sounders FC.
 March 17 – FC Cincinnati made its MLS home debut, winning 3–0 over the Portland Timbers.
 2021 – The new home of FC Cincinnati, TQL Stadium opens on May 16.
 2022 – On August 11, the Cincinnati FBI field office attack occurs.

See also
 History of Cincinnati
 List of mayors of Cincinnati
 Timeline of Newport, Kentucky, in vicinity of Cincinnati

Other cities in Ohio
 Timeline of Cleveland
 Timeline of Columbus, Ohio
 Timeline of Toledo, Ohio

References

Bibliography

Published in the 19th century
 
 
 
 
 
 
 
 
 1856
 1860, 1861, 1862
 1870, 1878

Published in the 20th century

External links

 Digital Public Library of America. Items related to Cincinnati, various dates

 
Cincinnati
Timeline
Years in Ohio